Mount Foresta is an  multi-peak massif located in Wrangell–St. Elias National Park, in the Saint Elias Mountains of Alaska in the United States.

History

The mountain was named for Foresta Hodgson Wood (1904-1951), who was responsible for the logistics planning of the Project Snow Cornice of the Arctic Institute of North America. Foresta, with her daughter Valerie F. Wood (1933-1951), were killed in an airplane crash in the vicinity of this mountain on July 27, 1951 during this scientific expedition. The Valerie Glacier flows along the southwest aspect of Mount Foresta. The names were proposed in 1957 by the Arctic Institute of North America.

The first ascent of Mount Foresta was made on July 24, 1979 by Fred Beckey, Rick Nolting, John Rupley, and Craig Tillery.

Climate

Based on the Köppen climate classification, Mount Foresta is located in a subarctic climate zone with long, cold, snowy winters, and cool summers. Weather systems coming off the Gulf of Alaska are forced upwards by the Saint Elias Mountains (orographic lift), causing heavy precipitation in the form of rainfall and snowfall. Temperatures can drop below −20 °C with wind chill factors below −30 °C. The months May through June offer the most favorable weather for viewing and climbing.

See also

List of mountain peaks of North America
List of mountain peaks of the United States
List of mountain peaks of Alaska

References

External links 
 Mount Foresta photo: Flickr
 Account of the first ascent: American Alpine Journal
 Weather forecast: Mount Foresta

North American 3000 m summits
Mountains of Alaska
Saint Elias Mountains
Wrangell–St. Elias National Park and Preserve